Dubin is a village in the administrative district of Gmina Jutrosin, Poland.

Dubin may also refer to:
Dubin–Johnson syndrome, an autosomal recessive, benign disorder

People with the surname
Abdulla Dubin (born 1941), Tatar television and radio newsreader
Al Dubin (1891–1945), American lyricist
Alan Dubin, American singer, vocalist of Khanate
Boris Dubin (1946–2014), Russian sociologist
Charles S. Dubin (1919–2011), American film and television director
Ellen Dubin, Canadian actress
Gary Dubin (1959–2016), American actor and voice actor
Glenn Dubin (born 1957), American hedge fund manager, former Principal of Dubin & Co. LP
Jane Dubin, American producer of Broadway plays
Jeanne Evert Dubin (Jeanne Evert (1957–2020), American professional tennis player
Joseph Dubin (1900–1961), American composer and orchestrator
Mordehai Dubin (1889–1956), Jewish spiritual and political leader in Latvia

See also

Dublin (disambiguation)